Federica Fortuni (born 30 September 1974) is an Italian former professional tennis player.

Biography
Born in Rome, Fortuni played on the professional tour in the 1990s, reaching a best singles ranking of 155 in the world. She featured in the qualifying draws for all four Grand Slam tournaments during her career.

Fortuni, who had a win over top 50 player Miriam Oremans at the 1994 Italian Open, had her most successful run in a WTA Tour tournament at the 1995 Delray Beach Winter Championships, where she made the round of 16 as a lucky loser. A last minute replacement in the draw for sixth seed Mary Joe Fernandez, she benefited from a first round bye, then beat Christina Singer, before being eliminated by Barbara Rittner.

ITF finals

Singles: 4 (1–3)

Doubles: 4 (4–0)

References

External links
 
 

1974 births
Living people
Italian female tennis players
Tennis players from Rome
20th-century Italian women